Mária Kiss (born 26 April 1949) is a Hungarian sprinter. She competed in the women's 100 metres at the 1968 Summer Olympics.

References

1949 births
Living people
Athletes (track and field) at the 1968 Summer Olympics
Hungarian female sprinters
Hungarian female hurdlers
Olympic athletes of Hungary
Place of birth missing (living people)
20th-century Hungarian women